Maharani Devi (full name: Vedisa-Mahadevi Sakyakumari) was, according to the Sri Lankan chronicles, the first wife and Queen of the third Mauryan Emperor Ashoka The Great. She was also the mother of Ashoka's first two children—his son, Mahendra, and daughter, Sanghamitra—both of whom played important roles in the spread of Buddhism to other countries. She is also remembered for the Sanchi Stupa.

Origin
According to the Ceylonese chronicles, Ashoka's first wife was the daughter of a merchant of Vedisagiri (present-day Vidisha), Devi by name, whom Ashoka had married while he was Viceroy at Ujjain. The Mahabodhivamsa (a Ceylonese source) calls her Vedisa-Mahadevi and a Sakyani or a Sakyakumari as being the daughter of a clan of the Shakyas who had immigrated to Vedisa nagaram out of fear of Vidudabha menacing their mother country. This would make her a relative of the Buddha's family or clan, as he also belonged to a clan of the Shakyas.

Marriage
Devi and Ashoka shared a close and loving relationship unlike the usual dynastic arrangements. She gave Ashoka his first two children—the boy Mahendra, born in about the year 285 BCE, and the girl Sanghamitra, born about three years later. Yet, Devi failed to convert Ashoka to Buddhism and he left her and their children in Vidisha when he was finally recalled to Pataliputra. Thus, Devi did not follow Ashoka as sovereign to Pataliputra, for there his Chief Queen (agramahisi) was his wife, Asandhimitra. It would have been unfitting for a prince of the House of Maurya to have a merchant's daughter for a spouse, and a more suitable wife was found for Ashoka in Princess Asandhimitra who was his chief queen for the majority of his reign.

Devi is described as having caused the construction of the Great Vihara of Vedisagiri, probably the first of the monuments of Sanchi and Bhilsa. This explains why Ashoka selected Sanchi and its beautiful neighbourhood for his architectural activities. Vedisa also figures as an important Buddhist site in earlier literature.

In popular culture 
Empress Devi plays an important role in modern artistic adaptions concerning Ashoka, playing the role of his love interest and wife in them.

 Asoka, a Bollywood movie where she is played by Hrishita Bhatt
 Chakravartin Ashoka Samrat, a TV serial where she is portrayed by Kajol Srivastav

References 

People from Ujjain
Women from Madhya Pradesh
Wives of Ashoka